The name Ukraine was first used in reference to a part of the territory of Kyivan Rus' in the 12th century. The name has been used in a variety of ways since the 12th century, referring to numerous lands on the border between Poland and Kievan Rus' or its successor states, and specifically for Ukrainian-inhabited lands from the 16th. The use of "the Ukraine" is officially deprecated by the Ukrainian government and many English language media publications.

Ukraine is the official full name of the country, as stated in its declaration of independence and its constitution; there is no official alternative long name. From 1922 until 1991, Ukraine was the informal name of the Ukrainian Soviet Socialist Republic within the Soviet Union (annexed by Germany as  during 1941–1944). After the Russian Revolution in 1917–1921, there were the short-lived Ukrainian People's Republic and Ukrainian State, recognized in early 1918 as consisting of nine governorates of the former Russian Empire (without Taurida's Crimean peninsula), plus Chelm and the southern part of Grodno Governorate.

History 

The oldest recorded mention of the word ukraina dates to the year 1187. In the following decades and centuries this term was applied to fortified borderlands of different principalities of Rus' without a specific geographic fixation: Halych-Volhynia, Pskov, Ryazan etc.

After the south-western lands of former Rus' were subordinated to the Polish Crown in 1569, the territory from eastern Podillia to Zaporizhia got the unofficial name Ukraina due to its border function to the nomadic Tatar world in the south. The Polish chronicler  who wrote about the Khmelnytsky Uprising in 1660 explained the word Ukraina as the land located at the edge of the Polish kingdom. Thus, in the course of the 16th–18th centuries Ukraine became a concrete regional name among other historic regions such as Podillia, Severia, or Volhynia. It was used for the middle Dnieper River territory controlled by the Cossacks. The people of Ukraina were called Ukrainians (or ). Later, the term Ukraine was used for the Hetmanate lands on both sides of the Dnieper although it didn't become the official name of the state.

From the 18th century on, Ukraine became known in the Russian Empire by the geographic term Little Russia. In the 1830s, Mykola Kostomarov and his Brotherhood of Saints Cyril and Methodius in Kyiv started to use the name Ukrainians. It was also taken up by Volodymyr Antonovych and the Khlopomany ("peasant-lovers"), former Polish gentry in Eastern Ukraine, and later by the Ukrainophiles in Halychyna, including Ivan Franko. The evolution of the meaning became particularly obvious at the end of the 19th century. The term is also mentioned by the Russian scientist and traveler of Ukrainian origin Nicholas Miklouho-Maclay (1846–1888). At the turn of the 20th century the term Ukraine became independent and self-sufficient, pushing aside regional self-definitions. In the course of the political struggle between the Little Russian and the Ukrainian identities, it challenged the traditional term Little Russia and ultimately defeated it in the 1920s during the Bolshevik policy of Korenization and Ukrainization.

Etymology

Interpretation as "region" or "territory"

Ukraina was initially mentioned in the Hypatian Codex in approximately 1187, referring to the name of the territory of the Principality of Pereyaslavl. The codex was written in the East Slavic version of Church Slavonic language.

Since then, and almost until the 18th century, in written sources, this word was used in the meaning of "border lands", without reference to any particular region with clear borders, including far beyond the territory of modern Ukraine. The generally "accepted" and frequently used meaning of the word as "borderland" has increasingly been challenged by revision, motivated by self-asserting of identity.

In the 16th century, the only specific ukraina mentioned very often in Polish and Ruthenian texts was the south-eastern region around Kyiv, and thus ukraina came to be synonymous with the Kyïv Voivodeship and later the region around Kyiv. Later this name was adopted as the name of the country.

The etymology of the word Ukraine is seen this way in all mainstream etymological dictionaries, see e.g. Max Vasmer's etymological dictionary of Russian; see also Orest Subtelny, Paul Magocsi, Omeljan Pritsak, Mykhailo Hrushevskyi, Ivan Ohiyenko, Petro Tolochko and others. It is supported by Jaroslav Rudnyckyj in the Encyclopedia of Ukraine and the Etymological dictionary of the Ukrainian language (based on already mentioned Vasmer).

On a map, published in Amsterdam in 1645, the sparsely inhabited region to the north of the Azov sea is called Okraina and is characterized to the proximity to the Dikoia pole (Wild Fields), posing a constant threat of raids of Turkic nomads (Crimean Tatars and the Nogai Horde). There is, however, also a specialised map published in 1648 of the Lower Dnieper region by Guillaume Le Vasseur de Beauplan called "General illustration of desert plains, in common speech Ukraine", attesting to the fact that the term Ukraina was also in use.

Interpretation as "region, country" 

Ukrainian scholars, beginning in the 1930s, have interpreted the term ukraina in the sense of "region, principality, country", "province", or "the land around" or "the land pertaining to" a given centre.

Linguist Hryhoriy Pivtorak (2001) argues that there is a difference between the two terms Ukraina україна "territory" and окраїна okraina "borderland". Both are derived from krai "division, border, land parcel, territory" but with a difference in preposition, 
U (оу)) meaning "in" vs. o (о) meaning "about, around";  *ukrai and *ukraina would then mean "a separated land parcel, a separate part of a tribe's territory". Lands that became part of the Grand Duchy of Lithuania (Chernihiv Principality, Siversk Principality, Kyiv Principality, Pereyaslavl Principality and most of Volyn Principality) were sometimes called Lithuanian Ukraina, while lands that became part of Poland (Halych Principality and part of Volyn Principality) were called Polish Ukraina. Pivtorak argues that Ukraine had been used as a term for their own territory by the Ukrainian Cossacks of the Zaporozhian Sich since the 16th century, and that the conflation with okraina "borderlands" was a creation of tsarist Russia. which has been countered by other historical sources of Russia.

Official names
Below are the names of the Ukrainian states throughout the 20th century:

 1917–1920: Ukrainian People's Republic; controlled most of Ukraine, with the exception of West Ukraine
 1918–1919: West Ukrainian People's Republic within West Ukraine; the Unification Act with UPR failed to be implemented
 1919–1936: Ukrainian Socialist Soviet Republic
 1936–1941: Ukrainian Soviet Socialist Republic
 1941–1944: There was no Ukrainian state under Nazi occupation (though one was declared); the territory was governed as Reichskommissariat Ukraine (RKU)
 1941–1991: Ukrainian Soviet Socialist Republic
 1991–present: Ukraine

English definite article
Ukraine is one of a few English country names traditionally used with the definite article the. Use of the article was standard before Ukrainian independence, but has decreased since the 1990s. For example, the Associated Press dropped the article "the" on 3 December 1991. Use of the definite article was  criticised as suggesting a non-sovereign territory, much like "the Lebanon" referred to the region before its independence, or as one might refer to "the Midwest", a region of the United States.

Use of Ukraine without the definite article has since become commonplace in journalism and diplomacy (examples are the style guides of The Guardian and The Times).

Preposition usage in Slavic

In the Ukrainian language both v Ukraini (with the preposition v - "in") and na Ukraini (with the preposition na - "on") have been used, although the preposition v is used officially and is more frequent in everyday speech. Modern linguistic prescription in Russian dictates usage of na, while earlier official Russian language have sometimes used 'v', just like authours foundational to Russian national identity. Similar to the definite article issue in English usage, use of na rather than v has been seen as suggesting non-sovereignty. While v expresses "in" with a connotation of  "into, in the interior", na expresses "in" with the connotation of "on, onto" a boundary (Pivtorak cites v misti "in the city" vs. na seli "in the village", viewed as "outside the city"). Pivtorak notes that  both Ukrainian literature and folk song uses both prepositions with the name Ukraina (na Ukraini and v Ukraini), but that only v Ukraini should be used to refer to the sovereign state established in 1991. The insistence on v appears to be a modern sensibility, as even authors foundational to Ukrainian national identity used both prepositions interchangeably, e.g. T. Shevchenko within the single poem V Kazemati (1847).

The preposition na continues to be used with Ukraine in the West Slavic languages (Polish, Czech,  Slovak), while the South Slavic languages (Bulgarian, Serbo-Croatian, Slovene) use v exclusively.

Phonetics and orthography
Among the western European languages, there is inter-language variation (and even sometimes intra-language variation) in the phonetic vowel quality of the ai of Ukraine, and its written expression. It is variously:

 Treated as a diphthong (for example, English Ukraine )
 Treated as a pure vowel (for example, French Ukraine )
 Transformed in other ways (for example, Spanish Ucrania , or Portuguese "Ucrânia" )
 Treated as two juxtaposed vowel sounds, with some phonetic degree of an approximant  between that may or may not be recognized phonemically: German Ukraine  (although the realisation with the diphthong  is also possible). This pronunciation is represented orthographically with a dieresis, or tréma, in Dutch Oekraïne . This version most closely resembles the vowel quality of the Ukrainian word.

In Ukrainian itself, there is a "euphony rule" sometimes used in poetry and music which changes the letter У (U) to В (V) at the beginning of a word when the preceding word ends with a vowel or a diphthong.  When applied to the name Україна (Ukraina), this can produce the form Вкраїна (Vkrayina), as in song lyric Най Вкраїна вся радіє (Nai Vkraina vsia radiie, "Let all Ukraine rejoice!").

See also 
 Etymology of Rus’ and derivatives
 List of etymologies of country subdivision names: "Ukraine"
 All-Russian nation
 Fuentes de Andalucía, which renamed itself to Ukraine in 2022
 Little Russia
 Kyiv#Etymology
 Toponymy

Explanatory notes

Citations

General and cited sources 

 
 
 
 
 
 
 
 .
 
 Rudnyt͡s′kyĭ, I͡a. B. (1951), Slovo ĭ nazva Ukraïna in Onomastica, v 1, Winnipeg: UVAN.
 
 
 
  Russian translation:

External links 
 

Ukraine
History of Ukraine
Ukrainian words and phrases
Ukraine